The 1964 Florida State Seminoles football team was an American football team that represented Florida State University as an independent during the 1964 NCAA University Division football season. In their fifth season under head coach Bill Peterson, the Seminoles compiled a 9–1–1 record, were ranked No. 11 in the final UPI Coaches Poll, defeated Oklahoma in the Gator Bowl, and outscored opponents by a total of 263 to 85. 

After five losses and a tie in the first six games of the Florida–Florida State football rivalry, the Seminoles defeated Florida for the first time. The next day, the sports editor of The Tampa Tribune wrote: "Yesterday, on a technicolor afternoon of brisk wind and refreshing chill, in a stadium that maybe squeaked with an overload, FSU ceased to be the OTHER school, became the football team in this state in the year of 1964, will hereafter claim equal time in all things."

The team's statistical leaders included Steve Tensi with 1,986 passing yards, Phil Spooner with 682 rushing yards, and Fred Biletnikoff with 1,179 receiving yards and 90 points scored (15 touchdowns). Biletnikoff led the country in receiving yards and also with 100 receptions, and was a consensus first-team end on the 1964 All-America team.

Schedule

Roster
WR Fred Biletnikoff, Sr.
QB Steve Tensi
 Phil Spooner

Season summary

Miami (FL)

    
    

Fred Biletnikoff 9 Rec, 165 Yds

Florida

    
    
    
    
    

Florida State accepted the Gator Bowl bid following the victory.

References

Florida State
Florida State Seminoles football seasons
Gator Bowl champion seasons
Florida State Seminoles football